Peter Ludwig Friedrich Baudri (20 April 1808, in Elberfeld (today part of Wuppertal) – 6 October 1874, in Cologne) was a German painter and member of Reichstag.

His brother was Johann Anton Friedrich Baudri, the Vicar General of the Roman Catholic Archdiocese of Cologne and the auxiliary bishop of Cologne.

Bibliography 
 Johann Jacob Merlo und Eduard Firmenich-Richartz: Kölnische Künstler in alter und neuer Zeit. Schwann, Düsseldorf 1895 (Publikationen der Gesellschaft für Rheinische Geschichtskunde, Band 9)
 Wilhelm Kosch: Das katholische Deutschland. Vol. 1, Haas & Grabherr, Augsburg 1933
 Robert Steimel: Kölner Köpfe. Steimel, Köln 1958
 Bernhard Mann: Biographisches Handbuch für das preußische Abgeordnetenhaus (1867–1918). Droste, Düsseldorf 1988,  (= Handbücher zur Geschichte des Parliamentarismus und der Politischen Parteien, Band 3)

1808 births
1874 deaths
19th-century German painters
19th-century German male artists
German male painters